Nariman A. Irani (?  10 December 1977) was a Bollywood cinematographer and film producer. He is most known for producing Don (1978) made under his banner Nariman Films and for his work as cinematographer in Chhailla Babu (1977). He died in an accident, even before Don was even completed, eventually the film was a big hit and led to the Don film franchise.

As a cinematographer he is known for his films like Talash, Saraswatichandra and Phool Aur Patthar,  Roti Kapada Aur Makaan and Chhailla Babu. He won the 16th National Film Awards for Best Cinematography (B & W) for Saraswatichandra (1968), he also won the Filmfare Award for Best Cinematographer in the same year.

Irani, while working on Chhailla Babu as a cinematographer, decided to borrow most of the plot of Chhailla Babu and shared a modified story idea to Chandra Barot, who made the new modified story as the film Don (1978). While Don was still under production, he was badly hurt, when after a sudden cloudburst in November 1977, a wall fell on him while he was preparing to take a shot for another film at Rajkamal Kalamandir studios, Bombay during the making of Manoj Kumar's Kranti. A wall collapsed on him and he suffered a hip bone injury. Though, he was hospitalised but died a few days later.

Personal life
Irani was a Parsi, although his surname is indicative of Irani origin. His wife Salma was a Muslim.

Legacy
His home banner Nariman Films was revived 18 years later by his sons, Nadir and Nadeem, with Suniel Shetty-starrer Shashtra (1996).

Filmography

As a cinematographer
 Sone Ki Chidiya (1958)
 Manzil (1960)
  Rustom Sohrab (1963)
 Phool Aur Patthar (1966)
 Bahu Begum  (1967)
 Saraswatichandra (1968)
 Talash (1969)
 Shor (1972)
 Roti Kapada Aur Makaan (1974)
 Chhailla Babu (1977)
 Immaan Dharam (1977)
 Don (1978)
 Dostana (1980)

As a film producer
 Zindagi Zindagi (1972)
 Don (1978)

References

External links
 
 

Film producers from Mumbai
Hindi-language film directors
Hindi film cinematographers
1977 deaths
Irani people
Year of birth unknown
Filmfare Awards winners
Gujarati people
Film directors from Mumbai
20th-century Indian film directors
Cinematographers from Maharashtra
Best Cinematography National Film Award winners